Doddington is a village in the civil parish of Doddington and Whisby in the North Kesteven district of Lincolnshire, England. The population of the civil parish at the 2011 census was 319. It includes the hamlet of Whisby, and parts of the Whisby Moor Nature Reserve.

In the Domesday Book of 1086, Doddington is written as "Dodingtone", in the Hundred of Graffoe, in Kesteven. It held 21 households, 14 villagers, 6 smallholders, a church with priest, and 4 ploughlands. Before the Conquest, lordship was held by Aelric son of Mergeat; after, the abbey of Westminster St Peter became Lord and Tenant-in-chief.

Doddington's Grade II listed parish church is dedicated to St Peter. The church was rebuilt in 1771 but retained its Early English font; the rebuilding was under the auspices of Lord Delaval. Pevsner notes that the architects, Thomas and William Lumby, retained and copied north aisle details from the previous Decorated building, and that the church holds a c.1569 chalice, a 1670 alms basin, a 1706 flagon by John Bodington, and a 1706 paten by William Fawdery.

John 'Jack' Delaval (1756-1775), the last male heir of the Delaval family, died aged nineteen and was buried in St Peter's Doddington. Reportedly the church interior was painted black for the funeral.

Other listed structures include farm houses, cottages and occupational buildings.

Within the village is the Grade I listed Elizabethan house, Doddington Hall,  a former seat of the Northumbrian Delaval family. The house is E-plan, and surmounted by three octagonal brick turrets with leaded cupolas.

References

External links 
 
 
 Doddington (with Whisby), Genuki.org.uk. Retrieved 7 April 2013

Villages in Lincolnshire
Civil parishes in Lincolnshire
North Kesteven District